Peter Haas may refer to:

Academics
Peter J. Haas (rabbi) (born 1948), American rabbi, professor at CWRU, and leader of Scholars for Peace in the Middle East
Peter M. Haas (born 1955), American political scientist
Peter J. Haas (computer scientist) (born 1956), American academic and operations researcher

Sportsmen
Pete Haas, American golfer who won the 1946 Monroe Invitational
Peter Haas, Australian rally car navigator in 1970 Australian Rally Championship
Peter Haas, Austrian canoeist whose team won gold medals at 1975 and 1977 Wildwater Canoeing World Championships
Peter Haas (athlete) (born 1955), Swiss Olympic sprinter

Others
Peter Haas (engraver) (1754–1804), German-Danish engraver
Peter E. Haas (1918–2005), American businessman, CEO of Levi Strauss
 (born 1963), Dutch businessman, former chair of Media-Saturn-Holding GmbH and Ceconomy AG
Peter W. Haas (born 1964), Slovak art photographer
Peter Haas, German drummer, member of Mekong Delta from 1991 to 1998
Peter D. Haas, American diplomat